Dale DeWitt (born January 17, 1950) is a United States politician from Oklahoma. DeWitt currently serves in the Oklahoma House of Representatives. He served as Majority Leader and Majority Floor Leader during 2011 and 2012.

Early life and career
DeWitt was born in Blackwell in Kay County in northern Oklahoma. In 1970, he received an associate degree from Northern Oklahoma College in Tonkawa. He then procured his Bachelor of Science in 1973 in agriculture education from Oklahoma State University at Stillwater.

DeWitt worked as an educator from 1973-2001, primarily for the Braman, Oklahoma school district.

Political career
DeWitt was elected to the Oklahoma House of Representatives in a special election in 2002 to fill the seat vacated by fellow Republican Jim Reese, who joined the George W. Bush administration in Washington, D.C.

DeWitt served as part of the leadership team under House Speaker Kris Steele, serving as Majority Leader and Majority Floor Leader. He contributed to and co-authored the redistricting bill in 2011.

In the 2012 legislative session, DeWitt authored legislation to protect Oklahoma's food supply against contamination from ricin, an extract of castor beans.

References

1950 births
Living people
People from Blackwell, Oklahoma
Republican Party members of the Oklahoma House of Representatives
Ranchers from Oklahoma
Farmers from Oklahoma
Oklahoma State University alumni
21st-century American politicians
Northern Oklahoma College alumni